Marston Green railway station is located in the suburb of Marston Green, in the borough of Solihull, West Midlands, England.  It is the nearest station to Chelmsley Wood.  The station, and all trains serving it, are operated by West Midlands Trains.

History
Unlike many of the other small rail stations constructed in the mid 19th century around Birmingham, Marston Green station has remained open to passengers since it was opened. However, none of the railway station's original features remain, having been replaced during the 1970s.

Facilities
The station has a ticket office located on platform 1 which is open Monday-Thursday 06:15-19:00, Friday 06:15-20:00, Saturday 08:00-20:00 and Sunday 09:00-14:00. When the ticket office is open tickets must be purchased before boarding the train. Outside of these times there is a ticket machine on platform 2 which accepts card payments only - cash and voucher payments can be made to the senior conductor on the train.

The railway station is adjacent to bus stops, where buses towards Solihull and Chelmsley Wood stop.

Services

All services are operated by West Midlands Trains. Most services operate under the West Midlands Railway brand and operate within the West Midlands region only.

A limited London Northwestern Railway service operates at the start and end of service and on Sundays when the local West Midlands Railway service is reduced.

See also
Transport in Birmingham

References

External links

Rail Around Birmingham and the West Midlands: Marston Green railway station
1902 Ordnance Survey map of the station
Warwickshire Railways: Marston Green station

Railway stations in Solihull
DfT Category E stations
Former London and North Western Railway stations
Railway stations in Great Britain opened in 1838
Railway stations served by West Midlands Trains